Suresh Appusamy is a Tamil Nadu born Singapore cricketer. He was born in Namakkal, Tamil Nadu on June 16, 1987. He is a right arm batsman and right-arm medium pace bowler.

Statistics
He plays for Singapore national cricket team. He played for the team in the 2014 ICC World Cricket League Division Three. His best bowling figures are 4/16 vs Maldives national cricket team and 4/35 vs Sinhalese.

Recent matches
Suresh Appusamy scored 6* and 2/12 vs Bhutan national cricket team. He took 1 wicket giving 21 runs against Kuwait national cricket team on 25 January 2015 and the same against Malaysia national cricket team on 30 January 2015 both at Sharjah.

References

1987 births
Living people
Singaporean cricketers
Indian emigrants to Singapore
Singaporean people of Tamil descent